Kraks Fond is a foundation based in Copenhagen, Denmark. The foundation was established in 1924 as the owner of the publishing house Kraks Forlag. In 2007, Kraks Forlag was sold to Eniro. The foundation is today based in Fæstningens Materialgård at Frederiksholms Kanal.

Research
Kraks Fond has supported research in city's economic development since 2011, especially through Kraks Fond Byforskning.

Investments
The foundation's assets are managed through the investment company Ove K. Invest A/S. It has investments in the companies Resolux ApS (30%), Omni-Drive (30%= and Inrotech Denmark (30%). Other investments are in the Nordic Real Estate Partners funds NREP Nordic Retail, 
NREP Copenhagen Residential and NREP Nordic Strategies. Fund II
Herlev Bymidte

References

External links
 Official website
 Kraks Fond Byforskning

Foundations based in Denmark
Urban planning in Denmark
1924 establishments in Denmark